Li Jingrun (born 7 May 2000) is a Chinese footballer currently playing as a defender for Xinjiang Tianshan Leopard.

Career statistics

Club
.

References

2000 births
Living people
Chinese footballers
Association football defenders
China League One players
Beijing Guoan F.C. players
Xinjiang Tianshan Leopard F.C. players